BALR. is a Dutch brand founded in 2013 by football player Demy de Zeeuw and internet entrepreneurs Ralph de Geus and Juul Manders. Eljero Elia and Gregory van der Wiel became shareholders, with the latter selling his shares in 2018. De Zeeuw, Manders and De Geus came up with the concept.

The brand is known for designs with the colours black and white. BALR. aims to make the life of a professional football player accessible to a wider audience.

BALR. sells their products online and in store. In 2014, a pop-up shop was opened in Amsterdam. The first store opened on November 4, 2016 in Amsterdam at the Kalverstraat.

The label gained traction in 2014 when a lot of professional players started to get spotted with BALR. products, although they have no affiliation with the brand like players have with many other brands.

References

External links 
 Official website

Clothing brands of the Netherlands
Dutch brands